The 1986 New Zealand rugby league tour of Australia and Papua New Guinea was a tour by the New Zealand national rugby league team. Test matches were played in New Zealand, Australia and Papua New Guinea. The tour began on 6 July in Auckland and finished on 17 August in Port Moresby, consisted of five test matches, with two of them counting towards the 1985-88 World Cup.

After having lost 18–0 to the Kiwis at Carlaw Park in the 3rd test of the 1985 series, Australia won the 1986 series 3–0. New Zealand then continued their tour to Papua New Guinea. In Papua New Guinea they won the first test against Papua New Guinea 36–26. They then lost the second test match 22–24, a match which counted towards the 1988 World Cup.

Squads

Australia
Australia was coached for the first time by 1956–57 Kangaroo Tourist Don Furner. Wally Lewis was the captain of the team with Wayne Pearce the team vice captain.

The players used by Australia in the series was: Wally Lewis (Wynnum Manly) (c), Wayne Pearce (Balmain) (vc), Noel Cleal (Manly Warringah), Steve Folkes (Canterbury-Bankstown), Garry Jack (Balmain), Brett Kenny (Parramatta), Les Kiss (North Sydney), Terry Lamb (Canterbury-Bankstown), Gene Miles (Wynnum Manly), Bryan Niebling (Redcliffe), Michael O'Connor (St George), Steve Roach (Balmain), Dale Shearer (Manly-Warringah), Royce Simmons (Penrith), Peter Sterling (Pattamatta), Peter Tunks (Canterbury-Bankstown).

Of the players used by Australia, only Wayne Pearce (injury) and Peter Tunks (personal reasons) did not go on the end of season 1986 Kangaroo Tour of Great Britain and France.

New Zealand
The New Zealand test team was coached by Graham Lowe and captained by Mark Graham.

The Kiwis squad was: Mark Graham (North Sydney) (c), Dean Bell (Eastern Suburbs), Shane Cooper (Mt Albert), Mark Elia (Te Atatu), Olsen Filipaina (North Sydney), Gary Freeman (Northcote), Barry Harvey (Western Suburbs (Taranaki)), Gary Kemble (Hull), A'au Leulaui (Hull), Hugh McGahan (Eastern Suburbs), Dane O'Hara (Hull), Ron O'Regan (Mt Albert), Gary Prohm (Hull Kingston Rovers), Joe Ropati (Warrington), Kurt Sorensen (Widnes), Brent Todd (Linwood), Wayne Wallace (Hornby), Darrell Williams (Mt Albert), Owen Wright (Manukau).

Peter Brown, Tea Ropati, Marty Crequer, Dean Lonergan, Adrian Shelford, Sam Stewart, James Goulding, Glenn Donaldson and Gary Mercer also played for the Kiwis against Papua New Guinea.

New Zealand leg
The tour began with Australia coming to Auckland to play the first of three test matches between the trans-Tasman rivals.

This would be the 18th and final test played between New Zealand and Australia at the Carlaw Park ground in Auckland. Due to sponsorship, the test series was known as the "Winfield Test Series".

With the selection of goal kicking St George and NSW outside back Michael O'Connor, the former Wallaby became Australia's 39th dual-code rugby international. Dale Shearer, Steve Folkes and utility reserve Terry Lamb also played in their debut tests for Australia.

First test

Australian leg
In the tour games the Kiwis defeated Newcastle 22–17, Riverina 14–16, Wide Bay 32-7 and North Queensland 46–6.

Second test
After having been Sydney's main test match venue since 1914, this would be the 69th and final test played at the Sydney Cricket Ground until 2008. Gary Freeman, who would go on to play a total of 46 tests for New Zealand until 1995, made his test debut in this game while for Australia, North Sydney and Queensland winger Les Kiss made his test debut replacing an injured Dale Shearer.

Third test
Australian vice-captain Wayne Pearce tore the Anterior cruciate ligament in his left knee during the first half. Despite surgery and an intense rehabilitation, he was eventually ruled out of the 1986 Kangaroo Tour after failing a team medical.

Australia continued its international dominance and scored a clean sweep against the Kiwis with a 32–12, 6 tries to 2 win in front of almost 23,000 at Lang Park. The match was broadcast into NSW and Qld by the Nine Network and via relay into New Zealand. This game also counted towards the 1985-1988 Rugby League World Cup.

Papua New Guinea leg
In Papua New Guinea they defeated Island Zone 26-6 and lost to Southern Zone 20-26 before the two test matches.

First test

Second test
This match counted towards the 1988 Rugby League World Cup.

Papua New Guinea scored their first ever test match victory against New Zealand and their first test win since defeating France 37–6 in 1977. The Kumuls would not win another test until 1990.

Aftermath
Following the loss to Papua New Guinea, Graham Lowe resigned in August to take up the position of head coach with English club side Wigan. Tony Gordon was appointed as his replacement in September.

Dun Furner and Wally Lewis would lead the Australian team on the undefeated 1986 Kangaroo Tour of Great Britain and France at the end of the NSWRL and BRL seasons.

See also
Australia vs New Zealand in rugby league
1985-88 Rugby League World Cup

References

New Zealand national rugby league team tours
Rugby league tours of Australia
Rugby league tours of Papua New Guinea
New Zealand rugby league tour of Australia and Papua New Guinea
New Zealand rugby league tour of Australia and Papua New Guinea
New Zealand rugby league tour of Australia and Papua New Guinea